Scarborough East was a Canadian electoral district represented in the House of Commons of Canada from 1968 to 2003.

It initially consisted the eastern part of the Borough of Scarborough, although its boundaries were adjusted several times.  It was created in 1966 from part of York—Scarborough. The federal electoral district was abolished in 2003 when it was redistributed between Pickering—Scarborough East and Scarborough—Guildwood ridings.

Members of Parliament

Historic boundaries

Election results

See also 
 List of Canadian federal electoral districts
 Past Canadian electoral districts

External links
Riding history from the Library of Parliament

Former federal electoral districts of Ontario
Federal electoral districts of Toronto
Scarborough, Toronto